Kwadi  was a "click language" once spoken in the southwest corner of Angola. It went extinct some time around 1960. There were only fifty Kwadi in the 1950s, of whom only 4–5 were competent speakers of the language. Three partial speakers were known in 1965, but in 1981 no speakers could be found. 

Although Kwadi is poorly attested, there is enough data to show that it is a divergent member of the Khoe family, or perhaps cognate with the Khoe languages in a Khoe–Kwadi family. It preserved elements of proto-Khoe that were lost in the western Khoe languages under the influence of Kxʼa languages in Botswana, and other elements that were lost in the eastern Khoe languages.

The Kwadi people, called Kwepe (Cuepe) by the Bantu, appear to have been a remnant population of southwestern African hunter-gatherers, otherwise only represented by the Cimba, Kwisi, and the Damara, who adopted the Khoekhoe language. Like the Kwisi they were fishermen, on the lower reaches of the Coroca River.

Kwadi was alternatively known by varieties of the words Koroka (Ba-koroka, Curoca, Ma-koroko, Mu-coroca) and Cuanhoca.

Phonology

Vowels
It had at least the nasal vowels .

Tones
The tone system is unclear, due to limited data and to the poor quality of recordings. At least two tones (high and low) are necessary to explain that data:

 'dog',  'fish'
 'meat',  'man, male'

Consonants
The following consonants are attested. It's not clear that all are phonemic;  for example are likely to be allophones, while a  distinction might have been lost by the time of the last recordings.

 is a ǃKung loan. Consonants in parentheses derive from Bantu loans. Intervocalic  also occur in Bantu loans.

Only dental clicks remain.

Morphology

Pronouns
Kwadi has personal pronouns for first and second person in singular, dual, and plural numbers. Pronouns have subject, object, and possessive cases. 1st person plural may have distinguished clusivity. Object pronouns are suffixed with -le/-de, except for the first person dual object pronoun, which is just mu. Possessive pronouns are the same as the subject form, except for the first person singular possessive pronoun, which is tʃi. Third person pronouns are simply the demonstratives, which are formed with a demonstrative base ha- followed by a gender/number suffix.

The known possessive pronouns are tʃi 'my' and ha 'his'. From the Khoe languages, it's not expected that all pronouns have distinctive possessive forms.

Nouns
Kwadi nouns distinguished three genders (masculine, feminine, and common), as well as three numbers (singular, dual, and plural). Some nouns form their plural with suppletion. For example: tçe "woman" vs. tala kwaʼe "women". The attested paradigm of nominal suffixes for masculine and feminine nouns is given below.

See also
Kwisi people

References

External links
Kwadi basic lexicon at the Global Lexicostatistical Database

Khoe–Kwadi languages
Languages of Angola
Extinct languages of Africa
Languages extinct in the 1950s
Unclassified languages of Africa